Vallensbæk station is a railway station on the Køge radial of the S-train network in Copenhagen, Denmark. It serves the southern end of Vallensbæk Municipality.

References

S-train (Copenhagen) stations
Railway stations opened in 1972
Buildings and structures in Vallensbæk Municipality
Railway stations in Denmark opened in the 20th century